Montebello station was a Canadian Pacific railway station in Montebello, Quebec, which served the nearby Château Montebello hotel and the community of Montebello. Like the hotel, it was built of Red Cedar logs.

The building now serves as a tourist information centre.

References

Canadian Pacific Railway stations in Quebec
Transport in Outaouais
Buildings and structures in Outaouais